Megan Kimmel (born 1980) is an American female sky runner and mountain runner who won 2016 Skyrunner World Series in SkyRace.

Achievements

References

External links
 Megan Kimmel profile at Association of Road Racing Statisticians

1980 births
Living people
American female mountain runners
American sky runners